Acartia ensifera is a species of marine copepod belonging to the family Acartiidae. It is found around the coasts of New Zealand.

References

Acartia ensifera at World of Copepods

Calanoida
Crustaceans described in 1899
Marine crustaceans of New Zealand